Sri Lankan National Badminton Championships are officially held since the year 1953.

Past winners

References

Badminton tournaments in Sri Lanka
National badminton championships
Sports competitions in Sri Lanka
Recurring sporting events established in 1953